The Volga Manor is a theme park in Harbin, a Chinese city in Heilongjiang Province with strong Russian influence. Named after the Volga River, one of the best known rivers in Russia, the park features Russian architecture, arts and cuisine. The aim of the park is to "reproduce Harbin's beauty of Russian classical architecture".

Major sites
There are several sites in the park:
 St. Nicholas Church: built in 2007 as a reproduction of the former St. Nicholas Church in central Harbin that was destroyed in 1966.
 Petrov Art Palace: resembles the Petrov Art Palace in Moscow.
 Vodka Chateau: Built under reference to a chateau in St. Petersberg.
 Pushkin Salon: Built under reference to Red Square in Moscow.

References

Buildings and structures in Harbin
2012 establishments in China
Amusement parks in China
Tourist attractions in Harbin